e.E. Charlton-Trujillo, a South Texas native, is a Mexican American filmmaker and novelist.

Biography
Charlton-Trujillo attended Texas A&M University-Corpus Christi, and did graduate work in film at Ohio University. While there, she wrote her first play, Bellies and Seeds the film Passing Through. They also was the recipient of I. Hollis Perry-Billman and the Betty Thomas Filmmaking Awards for their thesis film Cielto Liendo (Pretty Sky).

she then moved to New York City as an intern at Killer Films. Later, living in Wisconsin, she finished her first novel Prizefighter En Mi Casa, which won the Delacorte Dell Yearling Award, as well as the Parents' Choice Silver Honor for 'giving life —sadness, hope and despair to a Mexican family living in a small town in south Texas.' her second book, Feels Like Home, was written the following year.

After living in Ohio for several years, Charlton-Trujillo released her third novel, Fat Angie, in March 2013. It received praise from authors Gregory Maguire (Wicked), Ellen Hopkins (Crank), Pat Schmatz (Blue Fish) and Jo Knowles (Harry's Place).  Fat Angie was named a winner of the Stonewall Book Award in 2014.

In August 2016 Candlewick Press at the author's request indefinitely delayed publication of their novel in verse When We Was Fierce following criticism from early readers over concerns of its use of an invented black vernacular.

In April 2018, Charlton-Trujillo was part of a panel at the Texas Library Association Conference titled "Author, Please Come! Never Mind. Please Don't"  where authors shared their experiences of being invited to speak at literary events only to have their invitations rescinded. Also part of the panel were authors Ellen Hopkins and Gayle Pitman.

Feature films 
 A Culture of Silence (Director)
 At-Risk Summer (Director)
 HOME (Executive Producer)
 Night Fliers (Editor)
 Revelation Trail (Casting)

Short films directed 
 A Handful of Pennies
 Bubbly
 Living Under Linda's Desk 
 Vanessa Rising 
 Office Beast
 Cielto Lindo
 Passing Through
 everything but water

Music videos
 Shiny and the Spoon "Take On Me"
 Magnolia Mountain "Don't Leave Just Now"
 Shiny and the Spoon "Bread and Butter"

Novels 
 Prizefighter En Mi Casa, 2006
 Feels Like Home, 2007
 Fat Angie, 2013
 Fat Angie: Rebel Girl Revolution, 2019
 Fat Angie: Homecoming, 2020

Picture Books 
 Lupe Lopez: Rock Star Rules, June 2022
 A Girl Can Build Anything, April 2023
 Lupe Lopez: Reading Rock Star, June 2023

References

External links 
 http://www.bigdreamswrite.com/
 https://www.imdb.com/name/nm3112739/
 The Progressive, radio show interview (2007)
 Blue Marble Books (April 2013)

American film directors
American film directors of Mexican descent
American women film directors
Living people
American women dramatists and playwrights
American women novelists
American writers of Mexican descent
21st-century American novelists
21st-century American women writers
Year of birth missing (living people)
Stonewall Book Award winners